Elena Fanchini (30 April 1985 – 8 February 2023) was an Italian World Cup alpine ski racer. Born in Val Camonica, she focused on the speed events of downhill and super-G. Her younger sisters Nadia and Sabrina also raced on the Italian team.

Biography
Fanchini won two World Cup races in downhill 9 years apart and won a silver medal at the 2005 world championships. She represented Italy at three Winter Olympics and six World Championships.

Illness and death
On 12 January 2018, Fanchini announced that she would not compete in the 2018 Winter Olympics at Pyeongchang in order to undergo cancer treatment. That November, she was preparing to return to the World Cup; during training in the United States at Copper Mountain, Colorado, she fell and suffered a fracture of a finger of the hand and a distortion-bruising trauma to the left knee, with fracture of the proximal fibula. The injury forced her to return to Italy and miss the 2019 season.

On 22 April 2020, sisters Elena and Nadia Fanchini announced their retirement from racing.

At age 37, Fanchini died from colon cancer on 8 February 2023 at Pian Camuno.

World Cup results

Season standings

Race podiums
 2 wins – (2 DH)
 4 podiums – (4 DH); 25 top tens (20 DH, 5 SG)

World Championship results

Olympic results

National titles
Elena Fanchini won 7 national titles.

Italian Alpine Ski Championships
Downhill: 2005, 2007, 2010, 2011, 2012, 2015, 2016 (7)

References

External links
 
 
   (Fanchini Sisters)

1985 births
2023 deaths
People from Lovere 
Deaths from colorectal cancer
Deaths from cancer in Lombardy
Sportspeople from the Province of Bergamo
Italian female alpine skiers
Alpine skiers at the 2006 Winter Olympics
Alpine skiers at the 2010 Winter Olympics
Olympic alpine skiers of Italy
Alpine skiers of Fiamme Gialle
Alpine skiers at the 2014 Winter Olympics